Eve and the Handyman is a 1961 American comedy film written and directed by Russ Meyer. The film stars Eve Meyer and Anthony-James Ryan. The film was released on May 5, 1961, by Pad-Ram Enterprises.

It was Meyer's follow up to The Immoral Mr. Teas, which had been very successful.

Plot 
Eve is dressed in a long raincoat and follows the handyman around as he makes his appointed rounds. She watches as he has humorous run-ins while cleaning toilets, taking scrap metal to the dump, cleaning windows, delivering a tree, climbing poles, and remaining a gentleman while trying to help a topless hitchhiker. But why is she watching him so carefully?

Cast
Eve Meyer as Eve 
Anthony-James Ryan as The Handyman
Frank Bolger
Iris Bristol

Production
The female lead, Eve Meyer, was Russ Meyer's wife. It was the only film of his she starred in although she was heavily involved behind the scenes on most of his early films. She did her own hair and make up and cooked for the crew. "I never worked so hard in my life," she said later.

The film's male lead, Anthony-James Ryan, was Russ Meyer's right hand man. The film was shot in San Francisco over a month in 1960. Ryan recalled, Eve typed the script, it wasn't even a script, just a list of ideas. That's all we had to work with. I improvised some of the stuff." Ryan also assisted in production.

Meyer says there was a crew of four - Russ Myer, his assistant, Eve Meyer and Ryan.

Ryan met his future wife, Jacqueline Stevens, while making the film. She played a nude model.

Reception
According to Ebert the film grossed nearly a million dollars.

Ebert also wrote "One of the most interesting scenes in the movie has Eve dancing in a low-cut dress while playing a pinball machine: the rhythm and cutting suggest sexual intercourse, and the scene has a nice balance between eroticism and humor. A frequent Meyer turnabout theme- the desirable woman who is rejected by the undesirable man- turns up in Eve in a hitchhiking scene. Unable to get a lift, Eve takes off one garment after another, still with no success."

References

External links 
 
Eve and the Handyman at TCMDB

1961 films
1960s English-language films
American comedy films
1961 comedy films
Films directed by Russ Meyer
1960s American films